The 2018 UEC European Track Championships (under-23 & junior) is the 18th continental championships for European under-23 and junior track cyclists, and the 9th since the event was renamed following the reorganisation of European track cycling in 2010. The event took place at the World Cycling Centre in Aigle, Switzerland from 21 to 26 August 2018.

Medal summary

Under-23

Junior

Notes
 Competitors named in italics only participated in rounds prior to the final.

Medal table

References

External links
 Results website
 Results Book
 European Cycling Union

under-23
European Track Championships, 2018
2018 in Swiss sport
International cycle races hosted by Switzerland
UEC European Track Championships (under-23 and junior)